Paul Cushing Child (January 15, 1902 – May 12, 1994) was an American civil servant, diplomat, and artist known for being the husband of celebrity chef and author Julia Child.

Early life
Child was born in Montclair, New Jersey, on January 15, 1902, to Bertha Cushing and Charles Tripler Child. When he and his twin brother Charles were six months old, their father died and their mother relocated them with her to her family's home in Boston.  It was there that Child attended Boston Latin School. After taking an extension course at Columbia University he then became a teacher in France, Italy, and the United States, instructing students in various subjects including photography, English, and French. In 1941, while at Avon Old Farms School, he was a teacher and mentor to future poet John Gillespie Magee Jr. Child was a fourth degree black belt in judo as well as a judo instructor.

Government service and marriage
During World War II, Child joined the Office of Strategic Services (OSS). While stationed in Kandy, Ceylon (now Sri Lanka), he met Julia McWilliams, who worked for the OSS as head of the Registry of the OSS Secretariat. They married on September 1, 1946, in Lumberville, Pennsylvania, and later moved to Washington, D.C.  A lover of world cuisine, Child was known for his sophisticated palate. After he finished his work with the OSS, Child joined the United States Foreign Service and introduced his wife to fine food. In 1948, the U.S. State Department assigned Child to be an exhibits officer with the United States Information Agency. While in Paris, his wife took up cooking and became a student at the famed Paris cooking school, Le Cordon Bleu.

After five years in Paris, Child was reassigned to Marseille, Bonn, and Oslo.

In April 1955, he was summoned from Bonn to undergo interrogation in Washington, D.C. While there, he was questioned about his political beliefs and the political beliefs of his co-workers. Specifically, he was questioned about Jane Foster, a friend of the Childs' during World War II. He was also accused of "homosexual tendencies" and told by agents that "male homosexuals often have wives and children". Feeling his privacy had been violated through the interrogation, Child's and his wife's opposition to the Senate investigations—spearheaded at that time by Senator Joseph McCarthy—was reinforced.

Child retired from government service in 1961.

Later years

Following his retirement, the Childs moved to Cambridge, Massachusetts, where his wife wrote cookbooks, and he took photographs to provide illustrations for them. Child was also known as a poet who frequently wrote about his wife; his prose was later celebrated in an authorized biography of her. In Appetite for Life, portions of the letters he wrote to his twin brother while the Childs lived abroad were included as an illustration of his love and admiration for his wife as well as her cooking skills and talent.

Julia Child's kitchen, designed by Paul Child, was the setting for three of her television shows. It is now on display at the National Museum of American History in Washington, D.C. Beginning with In Julia's Kitchen with Master Chefs, the Childs' home kitchen in Cambridge was fully transformed into a functional set, with TV-quality lighting, three cameras positioned to catch all angles in the room, and a massive center island with a gas stovetop on one side and an electric stovetop on the other, but leaving the rest of the Childs' appliances alone.

Barbara Hansen, for the Los Angeles Times in 1989, highlighted an exhibition of Child's photographs and paintings at the Southern California Culinary Guild and commented that "although he has had some small exhibits, Child has received scant personal recognition. Mostly, he has remained in his wife’s shadow". Hansen highlighted a 1954 photograph as "the most arresting, perhaps," in the exhibit; the photograph features "a sensitive study of Julia in a cowl-necked blue dress holding an amber cat".

Paul Child died at a nursing home in Lexington, Massachusetts, on May 12, 1994, following a long illness. His widow, Julia Child, died ten years later, on August 13, 2004. A collection of papers held at the Schlesinger Library includes a selection of both Paul and Julia Child's journals, notes, personal and professional correspondence, along with a selection of Paul Child's artwork (photographs, prose and poetry).

Posthumous publications 

 2017 France Is a Feast: The Photographic Journey of Paul and Julia Child. Written by Alex Prud’homme, great-nephew of Paul Child, and Katie Pratt; features 225 photographs by Child.

In popular culture 

 Child was portrayed by Stanley Tucci in the 2009 comedy-drama film Julie & Julia, which was adapted in part from Julia Child's memoir My Life in France; the film included Child's interrogation in 1955.
 He was portrayed by David Hyde Pierce in the 2022 television series Julia.

References

Additional sources
Conant, Jennet, A Covert Affair: Julia and Paul Child in the OSS (New York: Simon & Schuster, 2011), 

1902 births
1994 deaths
20th-century American diplomats
American civil servants
American expatriates in France
American illustrators
Boston Latin School alumni
Columbia College (New York) alumni
People from Lexington, Massachusetts
People from Montclair, New Jersey
People of the Office of Strategic Services